Gowdara Mallikarjunappa Siddeshwara (born 5 July  1952), popularly known as G. M. Siddeshwara,  is a member of the Lok Sabha, representing Davangere constituency of Karnataka since from 2004. He represents  Davangere Constituency in 14th,15th,16th and 17th Lok Sabha. He was the Union Minister of State for Heavy Industries and Public Enterprises and prior to that, Minister of State for Civil Aviation of India till he resigned from the Ministry after a few days of cabinet reshuffle in July 2016.

Personal life
Siddeshwara was born on 5 July 1952. His father G. Mallikarjunappa (died 2002) was also a Member of Parliament for two terms: 1996–1998 and 1999–2002. Mallikarjunappa was affiliated to the RSS before joining the BJP electoral politics.

Political career
Being an active member of the Bharatiya Janata Party, he served as the Vice-President of the Karnataka State (2009-2010) and the National Parliamentary Party Treasurer of the Bharatiya Janata Party from 2004-2014. Hitherto, he served as the Secretary of Karnataka state BJP; Member of Parliamentary Consultative Committee for Ministry of Human Resource Development and Member of the Parliamentary Committee on Finance (2004 to 2009), Member of Parliamentary Committee on Water Resources (2009-2010); Member of Parliamentary Committee on Finance; and Member of Parliamentary Consultative Committee for the Ministry of Commerce & Industry (March 2010 - May 2014). He was re-elected to the 16th Lok Sabha from Davangere for the third time successively with a margin of 17, 607 votes defeating his Congress rival.

He served as Minister of State for Civil Aviation from 26 May 2014 to 9 November 2015 and Minister of State for Heavy Industries and Public Enterprises from 9 November 2014 to 12 July 2016.

References

External links
 Bharatiya Janata Party  
 
 Members of fifteenth Lok Sabha - Parliament of India website

Living people
1952 births
India MPs 2004–2009
People from Chitradurga
India MPs 2009–2014
Kannada people
Lok Sabha members from Karnataka
India MPs 2014–2019
Bharatiya Janata Party politicians from Karnataka
Narendra Modi ministry
People from Davanagere
India MPs 2019–present